The 2018 Clásica de Almería was the 33rd edition of the Clásica de Almería road cycling one day race. It was part of UCI Europe Tour in category 1.HC.

Teams
Twenty teams of up to seven riders started the race:

Result

References

Clásica de Almería
Clásica de Almería
Clásica de Almería